Mary and Martha may refer to:

Jesus at the home of Martha and Mary, a story in the Gospel of Luke, chapter 10
Mary and Martha, sisters of Lazarus of Bethany, in the Gospel of John, chapter 11
Mary of Bethany
Martha
Mary and Martha (film), a 2013 British television movie starring Hilary Swank and Brenda Blethyn
Mary and Martha Society, a Christianity-based service organization

See also
Martha and Mary Magdalene (Caravaggio)
Christ in the House of Martha and Mary (Velázquez)
Christ in the House of Martha and Mary (Vermeer)
Marfo-Mariinsky Convent